Dhanya Balakrishna is an Indian actress who has appeared mostly in Telugu films along with Tamil, Kannada and Malayalam films. After making her debut in A. R. Murugadoss's 7aum Arivu (2011), she appeared in ventures including Gautham Vasudev Menon's Neethaane En Ponvasantham (2012), Atlee's Raja Rani (2013) and Srikanth Addala's Seethamma Vaakitlo Sirimalle Chettu (2013).   Dhanya made her debut as female lead in Telugu  with Chinni Chinni Aasa (2013).

Early life
Dhanya Balakrishna was born in Bangalore, Karnataka. Kannada is her mother tongue. She was educated at MES.

Career
Dhanya began her acting career with performances in theatre, before playing a supporting role in A. R. Murugadoss's 7aum Arivu (2011) alongside Suriya and Shruti Haasan. She was next seen in two bilingual projects, portraying supporting roles -Kadhalil Sodhappuvadhu Yeppadi (2012) and then Gautham Vasudev Menon's Neethaane En Ponvasantham (2012).

Dhanya, portrayed supporting role in the 2013 Telugu film Seethamma Vakitlo Sirimalle Chettu as a girl who proposes to the character played by Mahesh Babu; while in Raja Rani (2013), she was seen as Nivitha, a friend of Nayantara's character. Her first leading role was in the Telugu film Chinni Chinni Aasa (2013), released in November 2013, while other projects, Amrutham Chandamamalo and Second Hand'', were released thereafter. She has been part of nearly 40 movies and 10 web series.

Filmography

Films

Television

References

Living people
Indian film actresses
Actresses in Telugu cinema
Actresses in Tamil cinema
Actresses from Bangalore
21st-century Indian actresses
Year of birth missing (living people)
Actresses in Malayalam cinema